Giles K. Ward (born March 6, 1948) is an American politician. A member of the Republican Party, he was elected to the Mississippi State Senate in 2007. In 2015, he was chosen unanimously to be the Senate's president pro tempore following the death of Terry W. Brown three months earlier.

References

Living people
1948 births
People from Winston County, Mississippi
Republican Party Mississippi state senators
21st-century American politicians